Judith K. Brown is an American phytopathologist noted for study of viruses that effect plants. In particular geminiviruses and Whitefly involved viruses. She has a PhD from the University of Arizona and teaches there. She was an associate editor of Phytopathology for three years and in 2003 a delegate for the National Academy of Sciences Frontiers in Science Symposium in Istanbul. In 2015 she became an American Academy of Arts and Sciences fellow.

References 

Year of birth missing (living people)
Living people
Fellows of the American Academy of Arts and Sciences
University of Arizona alumni
University of Arizona faculty
American phytopathologists
Women phytopathologists
Place of birth missing (living people)
Academic journal editors